Engracia or Engrácia may refer to:

Abbey of Santa Engracia, Benedictine monastery in Zaragoza, Aragon, Spain, established no later than the 6th century
Church of Santa Engrácia, 17th century monument of the city of Lisbon
Church of Santa Engracia de Zaragoza, basilica church in Zaragoza, Spain
Engracia Cruz-Reyes (1892–1975), Filipino chef and entrepreneur
Santa Engrácia (Lisbon), Portuguese parish (freguesia) in the municipality of Lisbon
Santa Engracia del Jubera, village in the province and autonomous community of La Rioja, Spain